Connally Findlay Trigg (September 18, 1847 – April 23, 1907) was a United States Congressman from Virginia and a Confederate soldier during the American Civil War. He was born in Abingdon, the county seat of Washington County, Virginia. He attended the common schools, studied law and was admitted to the bar in 1870 and commenced practice in Abingdon.

He was the son of Dr. Daniel Trigg of Abingdon and Anna Munford Tompkins, who was a lineal descendant of William Byrd of Westover and Robert "King" Carter. This also made him a cousin of General Robert E. Lee.

During the Civil War, he was a private in the First Virginia Cavalry and also served in the Confederate States Navy. After the war, he was elected Commonwealth attorney for Washington County in 1872, which position he held until he resigned in 1884 to become a candidate for Congress. He was elected as a Democrat to the Forty-ninth Congress (March 4, 1885 to March 3, 1887). He resumed the practice of law. He died in Abingdon on April 23, 1907 and was buried in Sinking Spring Cemetery.

References

External links
 

1847 births
1907 deaths
Virginia lawyers
Politicians from Abingdon, Virginia
People from Abingdon, Virginia
Democratic Party members of the United States House of Representatives from Virginia
19th-century American politicians
19th-century American lawyers
20th-century American lawyers
County and city Commonwealth's Attorneys in Virginia